HV71, often referred to as just HV, is a Swedish professional ice hockey club based in Jönköping, playing in the Swedish Hockey League (SHL), the first tier of Swedish ice hockey. The team played in the 2008–09 Champions Hockey League season, and also participates in the new Champions Hockey League tournament since the 2014–15 season. Between 2008 and 2013, HV also participated in the European Trophy tournament. With the exception of a one-year stint in the 2021–22 season in Sweden's second tier, HockeyAllsvenskan, where they won the promotion playoffs, the club has played continuously in the SHL since 1986.

History

HV71 was founded on May 24, 1971, as a merger between Husqvarna IF and Vätterstads IK, and took the name Huskvarna/Vätterstads IF but later that year it was shortened to the current name HV71. The club first entered the top Swedish league, Elitserien, in 1979, but was soon relegated. They won promotion again in 1985–86 and have remained in the top division ever since with the exception of the 2021-22 season, and are as of the 2000s a well-established top club in Sweden. The club has won the national championship five times; 1995, 2004, 2008, 2010 and 2017. For a few years in the late 1990s, HV71 was also called the Blue Bulls.

Many Swedes associate HV71 with the club's old arena Rosenlundshallen, which was inaugurated in 1958 as Sweden's first indoor ice hockey arena, but was replaced in 2000 with the new and improved Kinnarps Arena. As the new arena was built around and on top of Rosenlundshallen, HV71 practically played its games during the season 1999–00 in a construction site.

On December 6, 2006, HV71 topped Elitserien after a 5-2-win over Färjestads BK, at the same time as the club's two youth teams (under 20 and 18 years old) topped their leagues, J20 SuperElit and J18 Elit. This was an event that had never happened before in HV71's entire club history.

1994–95 season
HV71 won its first national championship season 1994–95 as the last (8th) team to qualify for the playoffs. The club is the only team in Swedish history to win the finals after ending as the 8th team at the end of the regular season. In the quarter-finals HV beat Djurgårdens IF Hockey, the team that finished first in the regular season, in three straight games. In the semifinal they came back after having lost the first two games to Malmö Redhawks, the team which was then defending champions, and turned the series around to a 3–2 victory. Finally they managed a decisive sudden death victory in the final against Brynäs IF in the fourth period of the fifth game to win the championship. The name of the historical scorer was Johan Lindbom, but other big heroes during the play-offs were the goalie Boo Ahl and the Finnish center-forward Esa Keskinen.

2003–04 season
The second championship was won during the season 2003–04 after beating Modo Hockey with a 4–2-game series, Frölunda HC with 4–2 in games in the semi-finals, and then winning the finals with a 4-3 match series against Färjestads BK. In the quarter-finals HV71 set a new Swedish record of scoring the most goals in one period with their seven in the first period of the second game against Modo Hockey. In fact they scored the seven goals during the last ten minutes of the period. The game ended with a 10–1 victory. In the final, goalie Stefan Liv managed to keep his goal empty in all four games that the team won, the two last games ending 1-0 and 5-0 respectively. He also kept the goal empty in the last semi-final, which means he managed this for five consecutive wins.

2005–06 season
HV71 finished the regular season 2005–06 as winner of the league table. For the first time in HV71's history the club faced Mora IK in the quarter-finals, winning the match series with 4–1. In the semi-finals the club was pitted against Färjestads BK. The match series did not have a winner until the last minute of the seventh game. Färjestads BK scored two goals in a matter of seconds during the last minute of the game, turning the game over and thus ending HV71's season. This is often considered the toughest loss in the history of HV71.

2006–07 season
HV71 ended the regular season as the second placed team after Färjestads BK. HV chose to meet Brynäs IF in the quarter-finals and managed after seven games (4 wins and 3 losses) to continue to the semifinals. The team faced Modo Hockey and even with home advantage HV did not manage to proceed to the finals having lost four out of seven games. This meant that HV for the second consecutive year lost a seven games series in the semifinal to the eventual Swedish champion.

During the season the newly acquired defenceman Johan Åkerman was a trendsetting player and also made his national debut for Sweden at the age of 34. HV's starting goaltender, Erik Ersberg, had his breakthrough and played for the national team; and was awarded with the Honken Trophy as Sweden's best goaltender. During the off-season he signed with the NHL team Los Angeles Kings.

2007–08 season
The 2007–08 season saw HV71 winning their third Swedish Championship, the second during the 2000s. HV71 finished the regular season as the league champion with 107 points, 15 points ahead of the second placed team Linköpings HC. HV defeated Skellefteå AIK in the quarter-finals, winning the series 4–1. In the semifinals HV met the fifth seeded team, Timrå IK. HV advanced to the finals after winning the series 4–2. In the finals HV managed to defeat Linköpings HC in six games, coming back from 2-0 down after the first two games. The sixth game went into overtime with HV's newly signed player Eric Johansson scoring the game-winning goal and winning the Swedish Championship.

Season-by-season record
This is a partial list, featuring the five most recent completed seasons. For a more complete list, see List of HV71 seasons.

Players and personnel

Current roster

Updated 16 March 2023

Team captains

 Fredrik Stillman, D, 1993–1995,
 Stefan Örnskog, LW, 1996–1997
 Fredrik Stillman, D, 1997–1999
 Per Gustafsson, D, 1999–2001
 Johan Davidsson, C, 2002–2013
 David Petrasek, D, 2013–2014
 Ted Brithén, C, 2014–2016
 Chris Abbott, C, 2016–2017
 Martin Thörnberg, LW, 2017–2020
 Simon Önerud, LW, 2021–2022
 Niklas Hjalmarsson, D, 2022–present

Retired numbers

Franchise records and leaders

Individual season records
Most Goals in a season: Kai Nurminen, 31 (1995–96)
Most Assists in a season: Johan Davidsson, 46 (2009–10)
Most Points in a season:  Esa Keskinen, 59 (1995–96)
Most Penalty Minutes in a season: Lance Ward, 273 (2006–07) (Elitserien record)
Most Points in a season, defenseman: David Petrasek, 53 (2009–10) (Elitserien record)
Most Points in a season, rookie: Kai Nurminen, 55 (1995–96) (Elitserien record)
Most Shutouts in a season: Stefan Liv, 6 (2003–04)

Source:

Scoring leaders

These are the top-ten point-scorers in club history. Figures are updated after each completed SHL regular season.

Note: Pos = Position; GP = Games played; G = Goals; A = Assists; Pts = Points; P/G = Points per game;  = current HV71 player

Trophies and awards

Team
Le Mat Trophy
 1994–95, 2003–04, 2007–08, 2009–10, 2016–17
 Tampere cup 1998

Individual
Coach of the Year
 Sune Bergman: 1994–95
 Pär Mårts: 2003–04
 Kent Johansson: 2007–08

Guldhjälmen
 Kari Eloranta: 1985–86
 Esa Keskinen: 1995–96
 Andreas Karlsson: 2005–06
 Johan Davidsson: 2008–09

Guldpucken
 Ulf Dahlén: 1997–98
 Johan Davidsson: 2003–04
 Stefan Liv: 2007–08Guldskridskon
 Fredrik Stillman: 1994–95

Honken Trophy
 Stefan Liv: 2001–02
 Erik Ersberg: 2006–07

Rinkens riddare
 Johan Davidsson: 2002–03
 Johan Davidsson: 2003–04
 Johan Davidsson: 2004–05

Rookie of the Year
 Peter Madach: 1979–80
Source:

References

External links

 HV71's official website

 
Swedish Hockey League teams
Ice hockey teams in Sweden
Ice hockey clubs established in 1971
Sport in Jönköping
Ice hockey teams in Jönköping County
1971 establishments in Sweden